Real TV (commonly known as America's Best Caught on Tape) is an American reality television program that ran in syndication from September 9, 1996, to September 7, 2001. It aired footage of extraordinary events that were not usually covered in mainstream news.

Synopsis
Real TV usually showed home and amateur video. The types of incidents portrayed were often daring rescues, escapes, stunts, and accidents. Clips containing violence or injury were not shown often. The clips had a narration provided by the host of the show, and were commonly set to a soundtrack to heighten the drama. Other clips have included TV show bloopers, human interest stories, and inventions.

Hosts
The show was hosted by John Daly (no relation to the golfer of the same name, or the game show host) from its beginning in 1996 through 2000, with Beau Weaver announcing until 1999. During Daly's run, the series was presented in the style of a newsmagazine, with show correspondents reporting further surrounding information and profiles beyond the video clips. Featured correspondents included Sibila Vargas, Michael Brownlee, John Johnston, Lisa G., and Ellen K. William B. Davis, best known as Cigarette Smoking Man from the sci-fi TV series The X-Files, also made occasional appearances.

In season 4 of the show, he was joined by Kristen Eykel, and Mitch Lewis became the announcer.

When Daly and Eykel left, Ahmad Rashad took over for them until the show's end. Rashad's version of Real TV had a new set, introduction, and announcer. It also became more of a generic video presentation show without surrounding correspondents, and any extra profiles on the subjects done by off-camera producers. It also targeted towards younger viewers, featuring more extreme sports footage, and less focus on human interest stories and celebrities. The show was canceled in 2001, and was replaced in many markets by the weekly series Maximum Exposure, which ran original episodes until 2002 and continues to air in syndication (Maximum Exposure was produced under the RTV News banner).

Segments

Clip segments
Various segments appeared in episodes, usually just as a way to thread featured videos of a similar nature. One feature that appeared often was "Quick Clips", which featured a number of quick video highlights of some amazing footage. Each episode of Daly's version had the "Real TV Quiz", which generally featured video footage of a celebrity before they became famous, challenging the viewer to guess who they were during the commercial break. Example: Zachary Ty Bryan actor from Home Improvement, was featured in a quick clip in 1998 from his appearance at the premiere of the movie "Blade" starring Wesley Snipes. Zachary was videotaped giving a shout out to Real TV on camera at the premiere by known Real TV contributor Michael Nordan a freelance videographer at the time. Viewers had to guess who the quick clip featured talent was. Announcer Beau Weaver announced the quiz at the start of the show's run before the quiz was taken over by Daly. During season 1, the quiz was before the second half of the show. The quiz moved to the end of the show at the start of season 2.

Closing clip montage and credits

Some clips were replayed during the closing credits, set to the show's theme song for most of Daly's run, although episodes with no clips during the credits had the title card on a different monitor in the studio and a short credit roll. In the show's third season, in episodes with a full credit roll, the title card appeared on a much larger monitor in the studio before the clip montage, and the 1995 Paramount Domestic Television logo also appeared on the monitor after the theme song ended.

Syndication
After its original run, the later episodes of Real TV (Eykel and Rashad run only) re-aired on TNN (The National Network) (later Spike TV, now The Paramount Network) from 2000 to 2003, while older episodes (Daly runs only) re-aired on Spike TV from 2003 to 2006, and the older episodes of Real TV (Daly runs only) re-aired on the Fox Reality Channel from 2005 to 2007. Real TV (Daly runs only) was also re-aired on WGN America from 2007 to 2008.

See also
Maximum Exposure
World's Most Amazing Videos

External links

1990s American reality television series
2000s American reality television series
Television series by CBS Studios
First-run syndicated television programs in the United States
1996 American television series debuts
2001 American television series endings
English-language television shows